The Indonesian featherback (Chitala borneensis) is a species of knifefish from freshwater habitats in Southeast Asia. The details of its range are not entirely clear, with FishBase reporting that it occurs in Sumatra, Borneo, and the Malay Peninsula, while Catalog of Fishes considers it endemic to Borneo.

There has been considerable taxonomic confusion between this species and C. lopis; it was argued as recent as 1992 that the two are variants of a single species, but later authorities have recognized them as separate.

C. borneensis reaches at least  in standard length. It is overall pale silvery-golden with many small black spots on the tail fin, anal fin and lower rear part of the body, and a black spot behind the pectoral fin.

References

Notopteridae
Fish of Southeast Asia
Fish described in 1851